Varlaam Moţoc was the Metropolitan of Moldavia (1632-1653). He edited the Romanian Book of Learning in 1643.

History
In 1643, the Moldavian Prince Vasile Lupu sponsored the Books of Homilies translated by Metropolitan of Moldavia Varlaam from Slavonic into Romanian (pre limba Romeniască) and titled Carte Românească de Învăţătură (Romanian Book  of Learning). The foreword by Prince Lupu says that it is addressed to the entire Romanian nation everywhere (la toată semenția românească de pretutindeni). The book, also known as "Cazania of Varlaam" (Varlaam's Homiliary), was the first ever printed in Moldavia and large numbers of copies spread in the neighboring provinces inhabited by Romanian speakers. The book was the first print of Moldavia.

Books 
 Cazania lui Varlaam, 1643 
 Response to the Calvinist Catechism

References

External links
 Vasile Motoc VARLAAM - biografie - (opera si scrierile)

1657 deaths
Romanian Orthodox metropolitan bishops
Year of birth unknown